This is a list of broadcast television stations serving cities in the state of New York, as of 2016–2017. The branding that the stations are commonly use are shown in bold.

Albany/Schenectady/Troy Area
Channel 6: WRGB - (CBS) - Schenectady, CBS 6
Channel 8: WNCE-CD - (YouToo America) - Glens Falls, True North
Channel 10/Channel 19: WTEN/WCDC - (ABC) - Albany/Adams, MA, News 10 ABC
Channel 13: WNYT - (NBC) - Albany, News Channel 13
Channel 14: WYBN-LD - (Buzzr) - Cobleskill
Channel 15: WEPT-CD - (AMGTV) - Newburgh, former rebroadcast of WNYA 51.2 "Antenna TV"
Channel 17: WMHT - (PBS) - Schenectady
Channel 23: WXXA-TV - (FOX) - Albany, FOX 23
Channel 45: WCWN (formerly WUSV) - (CW) - Schenectady, CW 15
Channel 51: WNYA - (MyNetworkTV) - Pittsfield, MA, My 4 Albany
Channel 55: WYPX-TV - (ION) - Amsterdam

Binghamton Area
Channel 10: WICZ-DT2 - (MyNetworkTV) - Morris, My 8
Channel 12: WBNG-TV - (CBS) - Binghamton, 12 News
Channel 12.2: WBNG-DT2 - (CW) - Binghamton, Binghamton CW 11
Channel 20: WBGH-CD - (NBC) - Binghamton, NBC 5
Channel 34: WIVT - (ABC) - Binghamton, NewsChannel 34
Channel 40: WICZ-TV - (FOX) - Binghamton, Fox 40
Channel 46: WSKG-TV - (PBS) - Binghamton

Buffalo Area
Channel 2: WGRZ - (NBC) - Buffalo, 2 On Your Side. Originally WGR prior to 1983.
Channel 4: WIVB-TV - (CBS) - Buffalo, News 4. Call letters stand for We're IV 4 Buffalo; originally WBEN-TV until 1977
Channel 7: WKBW-TV - (ABC) - Buffalo, 7 Eyewitness News
Channel 15: WNBF-CD - TCT) - Buffalo.
Channel 17: WNED-TV - (PBS) - Buffalo
Channel 23: WNLO - (CW) - Buffalo, CW 23. Originally independent and WNEQ (PBS), formerly UPN 23
Channel 29: WUTV - (FOX) - Buffalo, FOX 29.  Independent until the 1980s
Channel 49: WNYO - (MyNetworkTV) - Buffalo, My TV Buffalo. Formerly Buffalo's WB 49
Channel 51: WPXJ-TV - (ION) - Batavia
Channel 56: WBXZ-LD - (COZI TV) - Buffalo
Channel 67: WBBZ-TV - (Me-TV) - Buffalo (Springville), Buffalo's Buzz. Formerly UPN 67 (1997-2002), launched in 1996

Elmira Area
Channel 18: WETM - (NBC) - Elmira
Channel 24: WTVE - (Dumont) - Elmira (defunct since 1954)
Channel 30: WSKA-DT - (PBS) - Corning (repeats WSKG-TV from Binghamton)
Channel 36: WENY - (ABC) 
Channel 36.2: WENY-DT2 - (CBS) - Elmira
Channel 36.3: WENY-DT3 - (CW) - Elmira, Twin Tiers CW 2
Channel 36.4: WENY-DT4 - (ION) - Elmira
Channel 39: WJKP-LD - (MyNetworkTV) - Corning
Channel 48: WYDC - (FOX)- Corning, Big Fox

Hudson Valley area
Channel 54: WTBY-TV - (TBN) - Poughkeepsie
Channel 62: WRNN-TV - (Independent) - Kingston, Regional News Network

Ithaca area
Channel 36 W34FR-D - (WENY) (ABC)
Channel 52 WNYI - (Daystar)
Channel 68/43 WNYS-CD - (MyNetworkTV) (Fox)

New York City Area
Channel 2: WCBS-TV - (CBS) - New York City, CBS 2
Channel 4: WNBC - (NBC) - New York City, NBC 4 New York
Channel 5: WNYW - (FOX) - New York City, FOX 5, WABD when it was the Flagship station of the DuMont Television Network, became WNEW before 1986
Channel 7: WABC-TV - (ABC) - New York City, ABC 7 or Channel 7
Channel 9: WWOR-TV - (MyNetworkTV) - Secaucus, NJ, My 9 (New York City), known as WOR before 1987
Channel 11: WPIX - (CW) - New York City, PIX 11 (formerly WB 11 and CW 11)
Channel 13: WNET - (PBS) - Newark, New Jersey/New York City, Thirteen
Channel 14: WNDT-CD - (FNX) - New York City
Channel 18: WVVH-CD - (YouToo America and Outside Television) - Southampton, Hamptons Television
Channel 21: WLIW - (PBS) - Garden City
Channel 25: WNYE-TV - (Independent) - New York City, NYCTV Life
Channel 31: WPXN-TV - (ION) - New York City
Channel 33: WJLP - Me-TV - New York City/New Jersey WJLP New Jersey/New York Call letters changed mid-night 10/1/2014 from KVNV to WJLP. On March 16, 2015, the FCC ordered WJLP to move their broadcasts from channel 3.10 to channel 33.1 on an interim basis.
Channel 41: WXTV - (Univision) - Paterson Univision 41 Nueva York 
Channel 46: WMBQ-CD - (FNX) - New York City, Simulcasting on WNDT-CD
Channel 47: WNJU - (Telemundo) - Linden, Telemundo
Channel 55: WLNY-TV - (Independent) - Riverhead
Channel 67: WFTY - (Unimás) - Smithtown, UniMás Nueva York

Olean/Jamestown/Western Southern Tier area

Channel 25: WVTT-CD - (This TV) - Olean; formerly W20AB/W25AK and WONS-LP
Channel 26: WNYB - (TCT) - Jamestown; was WNYP from 1966 to 1969 and WTJA from 1988 to 1991
Channel 26.3: WNYB-DT2 - Light TV
Channel 30:  WBUO-LD - (Retro TV)

Plattsburgh/Champlain Valley Area
Channel 3: WCAX-TV - (CBS) - Burlington, VT
Channel 5.1, 5.3, 31.1: WPTZ - (NBC) - Plattsburgh, NBC 5; PTZ=Plattsburgh
Channel 22: WVNY - (ABC) - Burlington, VT, Local 22
Channel 40: WYCI - (Saranac Lake)
Channel 44: WFFF-TV - (FOX) - Burlington, VT, Local 44
Channel 57: WCFE-TV - (PBS) - Plattsburgh, Mountain Lake PBS; CFE= Clinton, Franklin, and Essex Counties, New York

Rochester Area 
Channel 6: WGCE-CD - (Court TV)
Channel 8:    WROC-TV - (CBS), News 8
Channel 10:  WHEC-TV - (NBC), News 10 NBC
Channel 13:  WHAM-TV - (ABC), 13 WHAM News HD
Channel 13-2: CW-WHAM - (CW), Rochester CW
Channel 21-1: WXXI-TV - (PBS), PBS Rochester HD
Channel 42: WNIB-LD - (TCT)
Channel 46-1:   WBGT-CD - (MyNetworkTV), My 18
Channel 51:  WPXJ-TV - (ION), Broadcasting from Batavia NY but serves Buffalo and Rochester

Syracuse Area
Channel 3: WSTM-TV - (NBC) - Syracuse, NBC 3. Signed on as channel 5 in 1950, but moved to channel 3 a short time later.
Channel 5: WTVH - (CBS) - Syracuse, CBS 5
Channel 9: WSYR-TV - (ABC) - Syracuse, NewsChannel 9
Channel 24: WCNY-TV - (PBS) - Syracuse
Channel 43: WNYS-TV - (MyNetworkTV) - Syracuse, My 43
Channel 52: WNYI-TV - Daystar - Ithaca/Syracuse
Channel 56: WSPX-TV - (ION) - Syracuse
Channel 68: WSYT - (FOX) - Syracuse, Fox 68

Utica Area

Channel 2 - WKTV - (NBC) - Utica, NewsChannel 2
Channel 2.2 - WKTV-DT2 - (CBS) - Utica, CBS Utica
Channel 2.3 - WKTV-DT3 - (CW) - Utica, Central New York's CW 11
Channel 11 - WPNY-LD - (MyNetworkTV) - Utica, My WPNY TV
Channel 20 - WUTR - (ABC) - Utica, WUTR Eyewitness News
Channel 33 - WFXV - (FOX) - Utica, WFXV 33 Eyewitness News

Watertown/Carthage Area 

Channel 7 - WWNY-TV - (CBS) - Watertown, 7 News
Channel 16/Channel 18 - WPBS-TV/WNPI-DT - (PBS) - Watertown/Norwood
Channel 28 - WNYF-CD/WWNY-CD - (FOX) - Watertown/Massena
Channel 45 - WVNC-LD - (NBC) - Watertown, NBC Watertown
Channel 50 - WWTI - (ABC) - Watertown, ABC 50
Channel 50.2 - WWTI-DT2 - (CW) - Watertown, The North Country CW

References

New York

Mass media in New Jersey